The 1999–2000 Scottish Junior Cup was a competition in Scottish Junior football. It was won by Whitburn; they defeated Johnstone Burgh 4–3 on penalties after drawing 2–2 in the final.

First round
These ties were scheduled to take place on Saturday 9 October 1999.

Second round
These ties were scheduled to take place on Saturday 6 November 1999.

Third round
These ties were scheduled to take place on Saturday, 4 December 1999

Fourth round
These ties were scheduled to take place on Saturday, 15 January 2000.

Fifth round
These ties were scheduled to take place on Saturday, 12 February 2000.

Quarter finals

These ties were played on Saturday 11 March 2000.

Semi-finals
These ties were played on 28 April 2000 & 5 May 2000, respectively.

Final
The final took place on Sunday 28 May 2000.

20
Junior Cup